WDMA-CD, virtual and UHF digital channel 16, is a Daystar owned-and-operated television station located in Macon, Georgia, United States. The station is owned by the Word of God Fellowship, Inc. subsidiary of the Daystar Television Network. WDMA-CD maintains office facilities located on Jeffersonville Road in northeastern Macon, and its transmitter is located between Hillcrest Industrial Boulevard and Bartlett Street in northwest Macon.

History
The station was founded on January 29, 1990 as W46BI and first signed on the air in 1995. The station's construction permit was allocated the station to UHF channel 46, however it broadcast on UHF channel 32 when it signed on. On April 6, 2006, the station moved from channel 32 to UHF channel 31, and doubled its effective radiated power from 16 kW to 32 kW. This resulted in a substantial increase in the station's signal coverage. , WDMA-CA had a construction permit to operate a digital signal on UHF channel 14 as WDMA-LD. On February 1, 2013, WDMA-CA flash-cut its into digital signal into operation on its former UHF analog channel 31. The station was issued its license for digital operation on October 8, 2014, and simultaneously changed its call sign to WDMA-CD.
In mid-June 2019, WDMA transitioned from digital channel 31 to channel 16 (formally held by full power station WGXA).

In early Spring 2020, WDMA-CD changed its PSIP channel from 31.1 to 16.1.

Digital television

Digital channel

References

External links

DMA-CD
Daystar (TV network) affiliates
Television channels and stations established in 1990
Low-power television stations in the United States